Rạch Miễu Bridge is a cable-stayed bridge in the Mekong Delta, Vietnam. The bridge connects Tiền Giang Province (Mỹ Tho) with Bến Tre Province, over the Mekong. Construction began on 30 April 2002 and was completed on 19 January 2009, when the bridge was inaugurated.

Under the original schedule, the bridge would have been completed and opened for traffic in late 2007.

Length: 8331 m including approach ramps. The main bridge consists of two separate parts No. 1 and No. 2 for a total length of 2868 m, which is a cable-stayed structure layout 117 m-270 m-117 m pace, not static navigational clearance height 37.5 m. In the middle of the bridge is island Thoi Son. The  bridge consists of two spans up to 90 m in length to inform the way the boat is  reinforced concrete beams pre-stressed construction the balanced cantilever method. The span girder bridge that leads pre-stressed concrete reinforced each span 40 metres in length. The ramp has a total length of two 5463 m and two main bridges with total length of 2868 m crosses the tributaries of Tien Giang and Thoi Son.
At 7:30 am on 20 August, the Ministry of Transport and the provinces of Ben Tre and Tien Giang held a connection with two cable-stayed span of the bridge tp connect the provinces.
The length of the main span is 270 m, and the clearance is 37.5 m to allow ships of 10,000 tons go through.
Bridge width: 12–15 m with two lanes of traffic
General construction contractors: joint venture CIENCO1 - CIENCO5 - CIENCO6
Bridge load: 30 tons
Total investment: VND 1,400 billion (US$84 million)

Review 

Although newly completed, Rạch Miễu bridge has some traffic problems, especially on holidays. Lunar New Year of the Ox in 2009, it was stuck in rush hours from 29th to 6th of Lunar calendar, one of the causes of traffic congestion is due to happen for the traffic on the narrow bridge, while being some vendors do where encroachment trafficking, in addition to those people who visit and take pictures on demand.

References

Road bridges in Vietnam
Bridges over the Mekong River
Cable-stayed bridges in Vietnam
Bridges completed in 2009
Buildings and structures in Tiền Giang province
Buildings and structures in Bến Tre province